Choice consists of the mental process of thinking involved with the process of judging the merits of multiple options and selecting one of them for action.

Choice may also refer to:

Mathematics
 Binomial coefficient, a mathematical function describing number of possible selections of subsets ('seven choose two')
 Axiom of choice

Media

Film and television
 Choices (1986 film), a television film directed by David Lowell Rich
 Choices (2021 film), an OTT Indian film
 "Choices" (Buffy the Vampire Slayer), a 1999 season 3 episode of the TV series Buffy the Vampire Slayer
 RTÉ Choice, an Irish digital radio station
 BBC Choice, a defunct British digital television channel, replaced in 2003 by BBC Three
 Choice TV, a New Zealand television station owned by Discovery New Zealand

Music
 Choice (group), a 1990s R&B girl group
 Choice (rapper), American female rap artist
 Choice, an alias for Laurent Garnier, a French techno music producer
 Choice, a 1983 album by British pop group Central Line
 Choices – The Singles Collection, the 1989 greatest hits collection from British pop rock band The Blow Monkeys
 Choices (Dewey Redman album), 1992
 "Choices" (Billy Yates song), a 1997 song, later covered by George Jones
 "Choices", a song by Mudvayne from Lost and Found (2005)
 Choices (Terence Blanchard album), 2009
 "Choices" (The Hoosiers song), a 2010 song by The Hoosiers
 Choices (EP), a 2013 EP by Clint Lowery (under the name Hello Demons...Meet Skeletons)
 "Choices (Yup)", a 2014 song by E-40

Publications
 Choice (comics), a fictional character that appeared in Malibu Comics Ultraverse comic book series
 Choice (Australian magazine), a publication of the Australian consumer organisation of the same name
 Choice (American magazine), a publication of the American Library Association
 Choices (journal), a food industry policy magazine

Technology
 Choice (command), a shell command to prompt a user to select one item from a set of one-character choices
 Choices (operating system), object-oriented operating system, developed at University of Illinois
 Design choice, in engineering

Other
 Choice (Australian consumer organisation), formerly named Australian Consumers Association
 Choice (credit card), a former credit card issued by Citibank
 Choice, Texas, an unincorporated community in the United States
 Choice Hotels, a hospitality holding corporation which owns several hotel brands
 Choice modelling, in research
 Choice of law, a concept within the field of the conflict of laws
 Pro-choice, a term used by abortion rights proponents
 Tashard Choice (born 1984), American football running back

See also
 The Choice (disambiguation)
 Choc ice
 TV Choice, a British weekly TV listings magazine